L'Arlésienne is incidental music composed by Georges Bizet for Alphonse Daudet's drama of the same name, usually translated as The Girl from Arles. It was first performed on 30 September 1872 at the Théâtre du Vaudeville in Paris. Bizet's music consists of 27 numbers for chorus and small orchestra, ranging from pieces of background music (mélodrames) only a few measures long, to entr'actes. The score achieves powerful dramatic ends with the most economic of means. Still, the work received poor reviews in the wake of the unsuccessful premiere and is not often performed now in its original form, although recordings are available. However, key pieces of the incidental music, most often heard in the form of two suites for orchestra, have become some of Bizet's most popular compositions.

History

Composition history

In July 1872, Léon Carvalho, director of the Théâtre du Vaudeville in Paris, commissioned Georges Bizet to compose incidental music for his production of Alphonse Daudet's play L'Arlésienne. Although the drama  was based on the author's short story of the same name, first published in the newspaper L'Événement (The Event, 1866), and later in his collection Lettres du mon moulin (Letters from My Windmill, 1869), the plot was originally inspired by a real event: the suicide of a nephew of writer Frédéric Mistral as a consequence of amour fou.
 
L'Arlésienne, incidental music, Op. 23 (1872)

Bizet composed 27 numbers for the five act play, which was presented in three acts and five scenes. Half of the numbers, mostly mélodrames, are quite short (under 20 measures) and are designed to be performed as background music for spoken drama. On the other hand, seven numbers, including the overture, an intermezzo (the "Minuetto"), three entr'actes, one longer mélodrame (the "Adagietto"), and the Farandole, are distinctive and lengthy enough to stand on their own outside of their stage setting.

The drama is set on the Rhône river, in Camargue, south of Arles, in southwestern Provence. To help give the composition Provençal color, Bizet used three existing tunes from a folk-music collection found in the book Lou tambourin (The Tambourin, Avignon, 1864) by writer and tambourinaire François Vidal:

 № 3: Danso dei Chivau-Frus (Dance of the Frisky Horses)—a brisk tune scored by Bizet for flute, piccolo, and tambourin (a Provençal drum); combined ingeniously with March of the Kings in the Farandole in Act 3 at the climax of the drama.
 № 7: Èr dóu Guet (Air of the Watch?)—heard in the form of a brief berceuse in a mélodrame (No. 13) in Act 2.
 № 31: Marcho dei Rèi (March of the Kings)—a Provençal Christmas carol from Avignon celebrating the Epiphany and the Three Kings; also identified as Marche de Turenne, supposedly composed by Jean-Baptiste Lully some 200 years earlier; quoted five times at the beginning of the Overture in different harmonizations and orchestrations; reappears in the form of a chorus in Act 3.

The premiere took place on 30 September 1872 in the Théâtre du Vaudeville. Bizet's music is scored for a chorus of 24 singers and an orchestra of only 26 players. Bizet played the harmonium (alternately with his publisher, Antony Choudens, and associate, Ernest Guiraud) backstage at the theater in support of the chorus. The play was staged as a last-minute replacement for another play, which had been banned by the censors, and the audience was less than favourably disposed to the new play. The premiere was a failure and the production closed after 19 performances. Daudet later bitterly remarked: "It was a resounding flop amid the prettiest music in the world, silk and velvet costumes, and comic opera scenery. I came out of there discouraged, still hearing the silly laughter caused by the emotional scenes." "It was clear from the beginning that a drama of passion from the Camargue would not appeal to the sophisticated tastes of the Paris boulevards."
 
L'Arlésienne Suite No. 1, Op. 23bis (1872)

Bizet was confident that the best numbers from the incidental music, arranged for a full symphony orchestra, would be successful in the concert hall, for he planned a five movement suite as follows: 1. Prélude, 2. Carillon, 3. Adagietto, 4. Minuetto, 5. Final (unidentified number). Later he exchanged the positions of the 2nd and 4th numbers and jettisoned the final one, leaving a four movement orchestral suite:
Prélude
Minuetto
Adagietto
Carillon
The order of the movements does not correspond to that of the incidental music version in either the original or final scenario, but conforms rather to the character and tempo conventions of a short symphony. The Prélude and Adagietto closely resemble their original versions except for their expanded instrumentation, which particularly benefits the Adagietto with its new massed strings sonority. The Minuetto structurally gains only a six bar addition to its coda. The Carillon (originally No. 18), on the other hand, is considerably enlarged by the addition of the andantino that frames the Adagio in No. 19,  followed by a shortened repeat of the opening section. Thus the movement now has an ABA form. The original title of the new work was L'Arlésienne, Suite d'orchestre, but after the appearance of a second suite (i. e.), it would be known as L'Arlésienne Suite No. 1. It was first performed on 10 November 1872 under Jules Pasdeloup of the Concerts populaires in the Cirque d'Hiver with great success.

L'Arlésienne Suite No. 2 (1879)

L'Arlésienne Suite No. 1 became so popular that the publisher Choudens commissioned a second set in 1879, four years after Bizet's untimely death. His friend Ernest Guiraud is claimed to have arranged the other three large scale movements and, adding an extraneous number (the Minuet), assembled a second four movement suite as follows:
Pastorale
Intermezzo
Minuet
Farandole
The choral parts of the Pastorale were arranged for orchestra. This two part movement acquires an ABA form, like the Carillon movement, by a repeat of the opening music. The Minuet was taken from Scènes bohémiennes, a suite of material originally composed for Bizet's 1866 opera La jolie fille de Perth. The Farandole (the name of a Provençal dance) is a condensation of several numbers of the incidental music in which, once again, the choral parts were arranged for orchestra. Although L'Arlésienne Suite No. 2 is assumed to be Guiraud's work (his name is not mentioned in any scores) and is not as unified as the first suite, it contains a large proportion of inspired Bizet material, and is therefore generally credited to Bizet. The first performance of the second suite took place on 21 March 1880 when Jules Pasdeloup again led the orchestra of the Concerts populaires.

L'Arlésienne, incidental music (1885)

The popularity of Bizet's music for L'Arlésienne was undoubtedly one of the factors prompting a later reappraisal of the original drama, and on 5 May 1885, a revival took place at the Théâtre de l'Odéon in Paris. Although again greeted coldly initially, the production was ultimately a great success. A new version of the score for full orchestra was used, in which some numbers from the suites, now expanded both in content and instrumentation (especially, for example,  № 18 'Carillon'), replaced the original small ensemble orchestrations of the 1872 version. A few numbers were omitted, duplicated, truncated, or exchanged positions.

Performance history
L'Arlésienne, incidental music

L'Arlésienne, Suite d'orchestre

Instrumentation

The score of L'Arlésienne makes novel use of the saxophone, at the time of composition just being introduced after its invention.

The specific drum to use in the percussion section is an issue of some controversy. Both Bizet's incidental music manuscript of 1872 and the score of L'Arlésienne Suite No. 2, arranged by Guiraud in 1879, specify a "tambourin", a low-pitched tenor drum, not to be confused with the tambourine. In the absence of a genuine tambourin, a tom drum or a snareless side drum is sometimes substituted. This was the circumstance in the premiere production, during which critic Arthur Pougin of Le Soir complained that the tambourin provençal had been replaced by an ordinary drum (tambour). In Provence, the tambourin is usually played in conjunction with the galoubet (a small pipe), making this combination a unique Provençal pipe and tabor. This is the effect Bizet was aiming for when he set the tune "Danso dei Chivau-Frus", from a collection by François Vidal, a player and historian of the tambourin. This tune is used in the Farandole and evokes the sound of tambourinaires playing during a festival celebrating Saint Eligius, patron saint of horses, farriers, and husbandry. Herbert von Karajan and Leonard Bernstein are two examples of prominent conductors who used a tambourine in one or more recordings, giving the Farandole a brighter ambiance than would have been achieved with the deeper resonance of the tambourin. The score of the first number of L'Arlésienne Suite No. 1, 'Prélude', specifies a "tambour", and although a tambourin could just as well be employed here also, many orchestras use a snare drum.

Incidental music (1872)

Main Characters
 Francet Mamaï (65), farmer of le Castelet, grandfather of Frédéri and L'Innocent
 Rose Mamaï (40), a widow, Francet's daughter-in-law, mother of Frédéri and L'Innocent
 Frédéri (20), the protagonist, obsessively in love with the Arlésienne
 L'Innocent (13), Frédéri's brother; regarded as having a developmental disability
 Balthazar (70), a shepherd
 La Renaud (70), Balthazar's love interest in earlier times, Vivette's grandmother
 Vivette (17), Rose's goddaughter, Frédéri's second love interest
 Patron Marc, Rose's brother, a Rhône sailor
 Mitifio (30), a Gardian

Synopsis
The Overture (№ 1) begins with five different orchestrations of the March of the Kings, and concludes with the first of several quotations in the score of L’Innocent’s theme, and Frédéri’s theme.

Act 1

Tableau 1: The farm at Le Castelet

In Scene 1, Francet Mamaï tells Balthazar of Frédéri’s passion for a girl from Arles. Both agree that Frédéri would be better off marrying a local girl, such as Vivette Renauld. L’Innocent, whose theme dominates the first mélodrame (№ 2) and the next two numbers, wants Balthazar to finish his story in which a wolf attacks a goat.

The next mélodrame (№ 3) links the first and second scenes of the play, as Balthazar, continues telling the wolf story to l’Innocent. The third mélodrame (№ 4) accompanies an exchange between Vivette, Rose Mamaï’s god-daughter, and Balthazar, where the shepherd says he thinks something is stirring in l’Innocent’s mind.

After a gay offstage chorus, a mélodrame (№ 5), introduces the theme of Mitifio, who reveals that the Arlésienne has been his mistress for two years. In the mélodrame and final chorus (№ 6), Frédéri is about to go off to Arles, but Francet tells him what Mitifio said. The chorus bursts in with a reprise of "Grand soleil de la Provence", and Frédéri’s theme accompanies his collapse by the well.

Act 2

Tableau 1: At the Étang de Vaccarès

The Pastorale (№ 7), the first movement in the second suite, with offstage chorus and accompaniment, sets the scene. In the following Mélodrame (№ 8) Balthazar and l’Innocent enter (using the latter’s theme), and the next (№ 9) marks the exit of Rose. Mélodrame № 10 accompanies the discovery of Fréderi in the shepherd’s hut, angry because everyone is spying on him. As wordless offstage chorus sing (№ 11), Balthazar leaves, having failed to make Frédéri destroy the letters from the Arlésienne which he reads night and day. The following mélodrame (№ 12) is only six bars; l’Innocent cannot recall the story he wants to tell his brother. In the next mélodrame (№ 13, Èr dóu Guet) described as a berceuse, l’Innocent falls asleep while telling his story. A nine-bar mélodrame (№ 14) evokes Rose’s desperation at Fréderi’s frame of mind.

Tableau 2: The kitchen at Castelet

The next music (the Intermezzo used in the second suite) depicts Vivette, the local girl who wants to marry Frédéri, preparing her parcels to take on the Rhône ferry (№ 15). After men prepare to go out shooting game Rose and the others fear that Frédéri might kill himself. At the end of the act (№ 16) when Frédéri decides that Vivette can help him forget his obsession, Balthazar and Rose express their relief.

Intermezzo

Act 2 is followed by the Minuet (№ 17) and the Carillon (№ 18), both used in the first suite.

Act 3

Tableau 1: The Castelet farm courtyard

A 6/8 Andantino Mélodrame (№ 19) marks the entrance of Mère Renaud in Scene III, and in the following Adagio (the Adagietto in the first Suite) Balthazar and Renaud reminisce about old times. As all move off to eat, there is a reprise of the Andantino. Another Andantino follows the exit of Frédéri and Vivette as they declare their love (№ 20). The farandole (№ 21, Danso dei Chivau-Frus) which begins quietly and builds to a climax sees Frédéri respond with fury to Mitifio who has come to tell Balthazar that he will run off with the girl from Arles (№ 22).

Tableau 2: The Magnanery

The farandole is heard, then the March of the Kings is sung by the chorus, after which the two are combined (№ 23); there is reprise for chorus of the March of the Kings (№ 24). In (№ 25) l’Innocent ‘awakens’ showing he understands his brother’s problem. In mélodrame (№ 26) Rose is momentarily reassured as the clock strikes three, while the Final is a powerful tutti version of Frédéri’s theme (№ 27) which brings down the curtain.

Source: Piano vocal score, Choudens, Paris (ca. 1885)

Suite No. 1 (1872)

The suite opens with a strong, energetic theme, which is based on the Epiphany carol "March of the Kings", played by the violins. Afterwards, the theme is repeated by various sections. After reaching a climax, the theme fades away. It is followed by the theme associated with L'Innocent (the brother of Frédéri, the hero). The Prélude concludes with the theme associated with Frédéri himself. The second movement resembles a minuet, while the third is more emotional and muted. The last movement, Carillon, features a repeating bell-tone pattern on the horns, mimicking a peal of church bells.

Movements
I. Prélude, Allegro deciso (the March of the Kings)

II. Minuet, Allegro giocoso (The ending of this movement is slightly expanded from the version in the incidental music.)

III. Adagietto (In the incidental music, this number is preceded and followed by a melodrama that, in the suite, forms the central section of the concluding Carillon. For this purpose it is transposed up a semitone.)

IV. Carillon, Allegro moderato (Expanded as indicated above.)

Suite No. 2 (1879)

The second suite begins with an introduction by the wind section, followed by the melody in the strings. The melodies are repeated by various sections throughout the first movement. In the suite, the opening section returns and concludes the piece. In the original version, the "central" section, which was a wordless chorus sung by women, ends the piece. The second movement intermezzo features utilization of low tones and begins with the wind section. Guiraud adds twelve additional bars to the concluding section. Sometime after this second suite was prepared from the L'Arlésienne music, Guiraud extracted the Intermezzo movement, added the Latin sacred text of the Agnus Dei to it, and published it as yet another "new" work of Bizet. The menuet, which is not from L'Arlésienne, but from Bizet's 1866 opera The Fair Maid of Perth, features solos by harp, flute, and, later, saxophone (this replacing the vocal parts of the original); it is the most subdued and emotional movement. The finale, the farandole, incorporates the theme of the March of the Kings once again. This is an expanded combination of numbers 21 and 23-24 of the original incidental music, in which the farandole appears first on its own. It is afterwards briefly combined with the march.

Movements
I. Pastorale

II. Intermezzo

III. Minuet

IV. Farandole

Recordings

Audio
Incidental Music

Suites

Video

1922, film directed by André Antoine with Jean Jacquinet as Marc, Maguy Deliac as Vivette, Gabriel de Gravone as Frédéric, Charles de Rochefort as Mitifio.
1930, film directed by Jacques de Baroncelli with Jim Gérald as Marc, Germaine Dermoz as Rose Mamaï, Blance Montel as Vivette, José Noguero as Frédéric, Charles Vanel, as Mitifio.
1942, film directed by Marc Allégret with Raimu as Marc, Gaby Morlay as Rose Mamaï, Gisèle Pascal as Vivette and Louis Jourdan as Frédéri; Paul Paray conducted Bizet’s score.

Notable uses
Music from the L'Arlésienne suites was played extensively in "Hammer into Anvil", an episode of The Prisoner.

The "Carillon" and "Farandole" were used on two episodes of Disney Junior's Little Einsteins.

The "Carillon" was used in a very successful media campaign in Puerto Rico, launched in the late 1980s by the local importers of Finlandia vodka. It featured French-born photographer Guy Paizy playing the role of a sophisticated, womanizing classical orchestra conductor. The campaign is still remembered in the island nation, almost two decades after its inception.

Albanian dictator Enver Hoxha adopted the First Suite's "Prelude" as a military march during his reign.

The Japanese group Mihimaru GT uses the theme of the "Farandole" for their song "Theme of mihimaLIVE 2".

American songwriter, composer, and arranger Ben Homer created a jazz arrangement "Bizet Has His Day" from Georges Bizet's "Farandole" from L’Arlésienne, (1945).

Jazz musician  Bob James arranged and recorded a jazz version of "Farandole" on his album Two (1975).

French choreographer Roland Petit created a ballet L'Arlésienne in 1974 which has been performed throughout the world, based on Daudet's short story and set against a Van Gogh landscape.

A rock version of "Farandole" appears in the Catherine video game by Atlus.

The song tune is also used in a character song called "England's Evil Summoning Song" from an anime called Hetalia: Axis Powers and was performed by Noriaki Sugiyama, who provided vocals for Arthur Kirkland/England. According to an interview with Noriaki in Hetalia Character CD Perfect Guide, the lyrics were entirely made up by the performer as the performance went on.

References

Further reading
 New York City Opera: Georges Bizet
 L'Arlésienne Suite No. 1, Classical Notes
 Suite No. 1, L'Arlésienne

External links
 

Compositions by Georges Bizet
Incidental music
Orchestral suites
1872 compositions
Adaptations of works by Alphonse Daudet